Hakarimata Range is a range of hills on the western edge of Ngāruawāhia township, in the Waikato region of New Zealand, overlooking the confluence of the Waikato and Waipā Rivers. The Hakarimata Range is separated from the Taupiri Range by the Taupiri Gorge, through which the Waikato River flows.

After the invasion of the Waikato, parts of the Hakarimatas were confiscated in 1864.  of native forest on the range are protected as a scenic reserve. A council supported community group, the Hakarimata Restoration Trust, created in 2001, is helping care for the range.

Location
Although now usually applied to the hills immediately west of Ngāruawāhia, maps such as Hochstetter's of 1859, the 1925 geology map and 1944 one inch map show 'Hakarimata Range' as extending south to what is now SH23. Similarly, old accounts describe the Whatawhata-Raglan road as passing over the Hakarimatas.

Name
Hakarimata's name derives from a 17th-century feast, when Ngāti Maniapoto joined the localWaikatos to celebrate the birth of a child. There was a mountain of raw forest foods; hence the name Hākari-kai-mata (uncooked food mountain), condensed to Hakarimata.

Geology
Hakarimata is part of the roughly north - south Kawhia Syncline (Taupiri to the north, Kapamahunga to the south), though the Hakarimata Anticline is at about a 30° angle to the rest of the syncline, probably due to strike slip movement along the Waipa Fault, Late Triassic Newcastle Group, sandstones, siltstones and greywacke have been folded, faulted and covered by other sedimentary rocks to form the Hakarimatas.

Flora and fauna

Plants
Hakarimata is the largest remnant of broadleaf-podocarp lowland forest that once dominated the Waikato. It is near the southern limit of kauri forest and northern limit of beech forest, with plants and animals of all three forest types. Occasional large rata and rimu stand above the canopy of tawa, kohekohe, hinau, rewarewa, mangeao and pukatea. There are also some miro, Hall's totara and tanekaha. The reserve also contains several threatened plants including Alseuosmia quercifolia, or topara, which is strongly scented in spring.

Animals
Tūī, kererū, pīwakawaka, pīpīwharauroa, kārearea, pekapeka, copper skink, Auckland green gecko and peripatus are among the species in the bush. 16 species of native fish include short and longfinned eels and banded, short-jaw and giant, kōkopu. In 1995/96, to connect the Hakarimata tree canopy with the Waikato River, and thus encourage indigenous fish, three Waikato tributaries had  of fences, 12 stock-water troughs, 5 bridges, and over 10,000 trees and shrubs added. By 2003, fish had increased from 63 to 80 fish per  of stream and a new species, lamprey, was found.

Pests
Since the land was reserved (from 1905 onwards), the fringe areas and lower slopes have slowly regenerated after suffering light logging, fires, pigs, goats, possums, cats, hedgehogs, rats, mice, stoats, weasels and ferrets, with occasional deer and wallaby. Goats, possum and rats are controlled, with possum self-resetting traps trialled in 2011. About  of privately owned forest adjoin the reserve, some of which is protected by covenant. Kauri dieback disease is not present, so a boot cleaning station was put at the Huntly end in 2015.

Fire is also a threat. In 2017 an area of 600 by 300m on a ridge beside the quarry was burnt.

Quarry
The large quarry at 181 Waingaro Road, Ngāruawāhia, opened in a quarry reserve in 1948 and now goes well below sea-level. It was bought by Brian Perry Ltd in the 1980s and sold to Fulton Hogan in 2016. An extension which would have doubled the size of the quarry wasn't permitted in 2008. It would have taken native trees estimated to be 800 years old. The quarry then employed 13 and supplied about 35% of the area's needs. Environment Waikato granted Perry Aggregates resource consents in 2009, following which bait stations were put in the area in 2011 and the quarry was given Mimico Environmental Awards for that and, in 2018, for extending native fish passage.

Tracks

The range has been used for recreational rambling since at least 1892.

There are two main walkways through the range, allowing excellent views of the Waikato Plains below. The main one is Hakarimata Walkway (12 km, 7 hr 30 min) along the ridge from Parker Road at the northern end to the Hakarimata Rail Trail (off Waingaro Rd) at the south.

Te Araroa follows that walkway to the summit, where a viewing tower offers vistas towards the coast, across the Waikato Basin and to Ruapehu on a clear day. Te Aroroa drops from the summit by the other main walkway, Hakarimata Summit Track (2 km, 3 hr return, 335 metres on 1349 steps), to Brownlee Avenue in Ngāruawāhia. The steps had 140,000 visits in 2016, compared to 5000 in 2011, shortly after they opened. The remainder of the track south to Hakarimata Rail Trail (3.5 km, 2 hr) can be linked by a 1.8 km walk along Waingaro Road back to Brownlee Ave.

There are several shorter walks using parts of the Hakarimata Walkway and/or the Summit Track:-
The Southern Lookout has views of Huntly and the north Waikato lakes, Hamilton and Tongariro on a clear day.
 In the middle, Waterworks Walk (1 km, 1 hr return) from Brownlee Avenue runs beside Mangarata Stream to the 1922 reservoir, once Ngāruawāhia's water supply. In November 2016 a Tomokanga (archway) was added near the beginning of the walk.
 At the southern end, Hakarimata Rail Trail (1.5 km, 30 min) follows the former Glen Massey railway. A short extension leads to the Cascades.

Gallery

References

External links
 Photographs and further details
 Photo of quarry

Mountain ranges of Waikato
Waikato District